Newminster Abbey was a Cistercian abbey in Northumberland in the north of England. The site is protected by Grade II listed building and Scheduled Ancient Monument status.

Ranulph de Merlay, lord of Morpeth, and his wife, Juliana, daughter of Gospatric II, Earl of Lothian, founded the abbey in 1137 and Saint Robert of Newminster from the Cistercian Fountains Abbey was appointed as the first abbot; he governed from 1138 to 1159. The year after its foundation, the abbey (at that time only a group of timber buildings) was burned in an attack by Scottish raiders. The Abbey construction resumed and in 1159 Abbot Robert died and was buried beneath the high altar.  His tomb became a shrine and place of pilgrimage, and a number of miracles were ascribed to him so that eventually he was canonised.

The abbey was located a short distance to the west of Morpeth, Northumberland, on the boundary between the lands of Ranulph de Merlay and Bertram of Mitford.  Both these minor barons, and also D'Umfraville of Prudhoe, Lord of Redesdale, were significant benefactors in the abbey's early years.  As a result, by 1240 the abbey possessed lands extending to Benton-on-Tyne where they had fisheries, to Cambois on the east coast where they had saltpans, and to Kidland on the Scottish border, where they annually led sheep to pasture during the summer months.  The abbey established daughter houses at Pipewell Abbey in Northamptonshire, at Sawley Abbey near Clitheroe in Lancashire and at Roche Abbey near Rotherham in Yorkshire.

After closure during the first wave of dissolution in 1537, the estate was leased by the Crown by the Grey family who used many of the stones for their own buildings.

The estate including the site of the abbey was sold by the Crown to Robert Brandling in 1609, and was sold on by the Brandling family in 1709 to John Ord of Fenham.

The site is in private ownership and there is no public access or parking near it. However, the site can be viewed from the hill above it and from a public footpath that runs on the west side. Access to the footpath is best from Kirkhill where you can park a car.

The abbey is the namesake of the Abbey Well water brand created by Waters & Robson.

Burials at the abbey
Saint Robert of Newminster d.1159
Ranulph de Merlay (d. c.1170), his wife Juliana and his son Osbert
Roger son of Ranulph de Merlay d.1188
Roger son of Roger de Merlay d.1239
Roger son of Roger de Merlay d.1265
Ralph de Greystoke, 1st Baron Greystoke d.1323
Robert de Umfraville, Earl of Angus d.1325
Sir Robert de Umfraville (d.1437) and Isabelle his wife
Ralph de Greystoke, 3rd Baron Greystoke d.1418

Civil parish 
Newminster Abbey was a civil parish, in 1891 the parish had a population of 174. Newminster Abbey was formerly a township in Morpeth parish, from 1866 Newminster Abbey was a civil parish in its own right until it was abolished on 30 September 1894 and merged with Morpeth, part also went to form Newminster.

References

External links
Newminster Abbey
Structural Images of the North East
Keys to the Past entry, with map

Religious organizations established in the 1130s
Cistercian monasteries in England
History of Northumberland
Monasteries in Northumberland
Grade II listed buildings in Northumberland
Scheduled monuments in Northumberland
Christian monasteries established in the 12th century
1137 establishments in England
1537 disestablishments in England
Monasteries dissolved under the English Reformation
Former civil parishes in Northumberland
Morpeth, Northumberland